Maryna Vyacheslavivna Kylypko (born 10 November 1995) is a Ukrainian athlete specialising in the pole vault. She represented her country at the 2020 Summer Olympics, finishing fifth in the pole vault final.

Her personal bests in the event are 4.65 metres outdoors (Trani, 3 September 2016, national record) and 4.55 metres indoors (Belgrade 2017).

International competitions

References

1995 births
Living people
Ukrainian female pole vaulters
Athletes (track and field) at the 2016 Summer Olympics
Olympic athletes of Ukraine
Sportspeople from Kharkiv
Ukrainian Athletics Championships winners
Athletes (track and field) at the 2020 Summer Olympics
20th-century Ukrainian women
21st-century Ukrainian women